Vaclav Vytlacil was an American artist and art instructor, and was among the earliest and most influential advocates of Hans Hofmann's teachings in the United States.

Life
Vaclav "Vyt" Vytlacil was born in New York City to Czech immigrant parents on November 1, 1892. At an early age he moved with his parents to Chicago.  In 1906, he began studies at the Art Institute of Chicago, returning to New York on a scholarship to the Art Students League in 1913. While there, he studied under portraitist John C. Johansen. Vytlacil left the League to take a teaching position at the Minneapolis School of Art. He also spent time in Europe, working as an assistant to Hans Hofmann and studying the Cubist movement.

During the late 1930s and early 1940s, Vytlacil taught at a variety of places, including the Art Students League of New York City, Queens College in New York, Black Mountain College in North Carolina, the College of Arts and Crafts in Oakland, California, and other art schools.  In 1946, he rejoined the faculty of the Art Students League and remained there until his retirement in 1978.  He successfully helped get his acquaintance Jan Matulka a job at Art Students League of New York.  Among his students were artists such as Louise Bourgeois, Willem de Kooning, Knox Martin, Frank O'Cain, Robert Rauschenberg, James Rosenquist, Cy Twombly,  and Tony Smith among others.

He was also known for being one of the founders of the American Abstract Artists group. He died in New York City, on January 5, 1984. After his death, his daughter Anne bequeathed his estate in Rockland County to The Art Students League of New York City.

Legacy

He has been ranked alongside top modernist painters including Pablo Picasso, Henri Matisse, Georges Braque, Ben Shahn, and others by a variety of critics, including Howard Devree of the New York Times.

Vytlacil's artworks are in the collections of many museums, including The Museum of Modern Art, The Whitney Museum of American Art, the Smithsonian American Art Museum, and The Metropolitan Museum of Art. Among his pupils was the sculptor Dorothy Rieber Joralemon. His student Frank O'Cain continues to teach painting, design and color composition according to Vytlacil's theoretical principals at the Art Students League of New York.

References

External links

"Vaclav Vytlacil and the Advent of American Modernism: 1920-1940" - The New York Times
Biography, Sullivan Goss Gallery
Biography, Smithsonian American Art Museum
Askart

1892 births
1984 deaths
20th-century American painters
20th-century American male artists
American male painters
Modern painters
Abstract painters
Art Students League of New York faculty
Painters from New York City
Art Students League of New York alumni
20th-century American printmakers
American people of Czech descent